The Cook Islands has competed in eleven of the Commonwealth Games to date.

The Cooks' first Commonwealth Games medal was won in 2018 by lawn bowlers Taiki Paniani and Aidan Zittersteijn.

Medal tally

History 
The Cook Islands first participated in the 1974 Commonwealth Games held at Christchurch, New Zealand, missed the 1982 games, but has participated in all the games from 1986 onwards.

List of medalists

References

 
Nations at the Commonwealth Games